Charles Deblois (27 May 1939 – 18 February 2019) was Canadian politician who was a member of the House of Commons from 1988 to 1993.

Early life 
Deblois attended school at the Seminaire du Québec, then at Université Laval. He became a journalist, working with Radio-Canada and TVA from 1970 until 1988 when he entered federal politics.

He was elected in the 1988 federal election at the Montmorency—Orléans electoral district for the Progressive Conservative party. He served in the 34th Canadian Parliament after which he was defeated by Bloc Québécois candidate Michel Guimond in the 1993 federal election when the riding was renamed to Beauport—Montmorency—Orléans. He died in 2019 at the age of 79.

Electoral record

References

External links

1939 births
2019 deaths
Canadian television journalists
French Quebecers
Journalists from Quebec
Members of the House of Commons of Canada from Quebec
Politicians from Quebec City
Progressive Conservative Party of Canada MPs
Université Laval alumni